Richard Joseph Jodzio (born June 3, 1954 in Edmonton, Alberta) is a Canadian former professional ice hockey left winger. He played in the National Hockey League (NHL) with the Colorado Rockies and the Cleveland Barons; he also played in the World Hockey Association (WHA) with the Vancouver Blazers and the Calgary Cowboys.

In his NHL career, Jodzio appeared in 70 games. He scored two goals and added eight assists while collecting 71 minutes in penalties. He played in 137 WHA games, scoring 15 goals and adding 16 assists with 357 minutes in penalties.

On April 11, 1976, in one of the hockey's most infamous moments, Jodzio attacked Quebec Nordiques star Marc Tardif with his hockey stick during a playoff game in Quebec City. Jodzio's crosscheck into the boards knocked Tardif unconscious and he repeatedly hit him as he lay helpless on the ice. Jodzio was suspended for the rest of the playoffs and charged with assault by Quebec police. After pleading guilty, Jodzio was fined $3000.

Jodzio was a trained boxer. Since the incident Tardif forgave Jodzio and they have met for press interviews.

Jodzio is currently the owner of Frontline Freight, a less than truckload carrier based out of City of Industry, California.

Career statistics

Regular season and playoffs

References

External links

1-Allo Police page 6, 4 July 1976.

1954 births
Living people
Buffalo Sabres draft picks
Calgary Cowboys players
Canadian ice hockey left wingers
Charlotte Checkers (SHL) players
Cleveland Barons (NHL) players
Colorado Rockies (NHL) players
Erie Blades players
Hamilton Red Wings (OHA) players
New Brunswick Hawks players
Oklahoma City Stars players
Springfield Indians players
Ice hockey people from Edmonton
Tidewater Sharks players
Vancouver Blazers players